"Island of Dreams" is a song, written by Tom Springfield, and released by The Springfields in 1962. The song spent 26 weeks on the UK's Record Retailer chart, peaking at No. 5, while reaching No. 2 in Ireland, No. 2 in Israel, and No. 7 on New Zealand's "Lever Hit Parade".  The song was a regional hit in the United States, reaching No. 14 on WLS's "Silver Dollar Survey" in Chicago, but nationally the song only reached No. 129 on Billboards "Bubbling Under the Hot 100".

"Island of Dreams" has been covered by a number of artists, including Johnny Tillotson, Mary Hopkin & Sundance, and The Seekers.

Chart performance

References

1962 songs
1962 singles
Philips Records singles
Songs written by Tom Springfield
The Springfields songs